Sharon Lee (born September 11, 1952) is an American science fiction, fantasy and mystery author who lived in Winslow, Maine from 1988-2018 before moving to nearby Waterville. She is the co-author (with Steve Miller) of the Liaden universe novels and stories, as well as other works, and individually the author of several mystery and fantasy novels.

Background 

Born Sharon Lee Backof in Baltimore, Maryland, Lee graduated from Parkville Senior High School in 1970, and attended University of Maryland, Baltimore County during the late 1970s while employed as Administrative Aide to the Dean of the School of Social Work and Community Planning at the UMAB Professional Schools in downtown Baltimore. Sharon Lee and Steve Miller were married in 1980. In 1988, they relocated to central Maine, living in Winslow.
 In early 2018, they moved "into town" to nearby Waterville (on the other side of the Kennebec River).

Throughout her life, Lee has been employed as various flavors of secretary, as well as advertising copywriter, call-in talk hostess, nightside news copy editor, freelance reporter, photographer, book  reviewer, and deliverer of tractor trailers. Beginning in August 1997, she served three years as the executive director of Science Fiction and Fantasy Writers of America, and was subsequently elected vice president, then president of that organization.

Lee's first professional fiction publication was "A Matter of Ceremony," Amazing Stories, 1980.  Her most notable works to date are the books in the Liaden Universe, written in conjunction with her husband, Steve Miller, published by Baen Books, and which are considered part of the space opera sub-genre. Lee and Miller also co-authored the Fey Duology - Duainfey and Longeye.  Lee has written a contemporary fantasy series based in Maine - Carousel series (Archer's Beach), which includes 3 novels published by Baen Books and several short stories.  In addition, she has written two Maine-based mystery novels—Barnburner and Gunshy—and several dozen short stories.

Bibliography

Carousel series (Archer's Beach) 
Carousel Tides (2010) 
Carousel Sun (2014) 
Carousel Seas (2014) 
Surfside (2013) 
The Gift of Magic (2015) 
Spell Bound (2016)

Jen Pierce Mysteries 
(based in Maine)
Barnburner (2002)
Gunshy (2006)

Liaden Universe novels 

(coauthored with Steve Miller)

Agent of Change Sequence 
Agent of Change (1988) 
Conflict of Honors (1988)  
Carpe Diem (1989) 
Plan B (1999) 
I Dare (2002) 
Local Custom (2002) 
Scout's Progress (2002) 
Mouse and Dragon (2010) 
Partners in Necessity (Omnibus edition of Agent of Change, Conflict of Honors, and Carpe Diem) (2000)
Pilot's Choice (Omnibus edition of Local Custom and Scout's Progress) (2001)
The Dragon Variation (Omnibus edition of Local Custom, Scout's Progress and Conflict of Honors) (2010) 
The Agent Gambit (Omnibus edition of Agent of Change, Carpe Diem) (2011) 
Korval's Game (Omnibus edition of Plan B and I Dare) (2011)

The Great Migration
Crystal Soldier (2005)
Crystal Dragon (2006) 
The Crystal Variation (Omnibus edition of Crystal Soldier, Crystal Dragon and Balance of Trade) (20110901)

Other Liad novels
Necessity's Child (2013)
Theo Waitley
Fledgling (2009)
Saltation (2010)
Ghost Ship (2011)
Dragon Ship (2012)
Dragon in Exile (2015)
Alliance of Equals (2016)  
The Gathering Edge (2017) 
Neogenesis (2018) 
Accepting the Lance (2019) 
Trader's Leap (2020) 
Jethri Gobelyn
Balance of Trade (2004) 
Trade Secret (2013),

Liaden Universe Short Story Collections
A Liaden Universe Constellation (2013) 
A Liaden Universe Constellation, Volume 2 (2014) 
A Liaden Universe Constellation, Volume 3 (2015) 
A Liaden Universe Constellation, Volume 4 (2019)  
A Liaden Universe Constellation, Volume 5 (2022)

The Fey Duology 
(coauthored with Steve Miller)
Duainfey
Longeye

Other Novels coauthored with Steve Miller 
The Tomorrow Log (2003)
The Sword of Orion (2005)

Anthology co-edited with Steve Miller 
Low Port (2003)

Awards and recognition

Science fiction conventions 
She and Steve Miller have been a Guest of Honor or Special Guest at a number of science fiction conventions, including:
SiliCon (1998); SheVaCon (2000, 2003); Albacon (2002); Balticon (2003, 2016);  MarsCon (2003, 2017); PortConME (2004, 2011); CONduit and Trinoc*coN (2004); Penguicon and COSine (2006); Stellarcon (2009); DucKon and Oasis (2010); ConQuesT and Chattacon (2012); Philcon (2014); Ravencon (2016); and ConFluence (2017).

On fan fiction 
Lee and Miller strongly oppose fan fiction written in their universe. "I don’t want 'other people interpreting' our characters. Interpreting our characters is what Steve and I do; it’s our job.  Nobody else is going to get it right. This may sound rude and elitist, but honestly, it’s not easy for us to get it right sometimes, and we’ve been living with these characters... for a very long time... We built our universes, and our characters; they are our intellectual property; and they are not toys lying about some virtual sandbox for other kids to pick up and modify at their whim.  Steve and I do not sanction fanfic written in our universes; any such work that exists, exists without our permission, and certainly without our support."

References

External links
 
 
 

1952 births
Living people
20th-century American novelists
21st-century American novelists
American mystery writers
American science fiction writers
American women short story writers
American women novelists
Writers from Baltimore
People from Winslow, Maine
Women science fiction and fantasy writers
Women mystery writers
20th-century American women writers
21st-century American women writers
20th-century American short story writers
21st-century American short story writers
Novelists from Maryland
People from Waterville, Maine